Not Like Everyone Else is a 2006 television film that aired on Lifetime Television and starred Alia Shawkat, Illeana Douglas and Eric Schweig. It is based on a true story of events that happened to Brandi Blackbear in 1999–2000. This telefilm was shot in Shreveport, Louisiana.

Plot
Shortly after the Columbine High School massacre, Union Intermediate High School in Tulsa, Oklahoma becomes one of many schools around the country to increase security measures to prevent school shootings.

Brandi Blackbear writes Stephen King-inspired horror stories and dresses in a goth style. Her defiance attracts hostility from people at her school. False stories of threats of violence were circulated, and the combination of her writing and authorities' natural hyperawareness following Columbine led to her being suspended. When some of her fellow students later saw her checking out a book on world religions, including Wicca (as research for her stories), they immediately branded her a witch, and eventually accused her of casting a spell that made a teacher sick. Fear of her spread through much of the school, and she was once again suspended.

Finally, her parents went to the American Civil Liberties Union, where they were told they have a strong case against the school for violating her civil rights. The ACLU sued the affluent school for $10 million, even though the Blackbears were not sure they deserved that much based on what Brandi had suffered. Still, the ACLU argued that the school would not take any lesser claim seriously. When the school offered a settlement, the Blackbears refused. They were not interested in the money, despite needing it; what they really wanted was to have their story heard in court to inform the public that the school had mistreated Brandi. The judge ruled to dismiss the charges rather than going to trial, and ordered the Blackbears to pay $6000 in court fees, which they could not afford. Eventually it was agreed to drop the fees if the Blackbears drop their appeal. Earlier that day at school however, Kimberly (the most popular girl in school, and Brandi's main tormentor) tries to interview Brandi for the school newspaper but she declines, and also, everyone at school expresses their admiration for Brandi, causing Kimberly to lose her popularity.

Further reading

External links
 
 
 
 

2006 television films
2006 films
American high school films
American films based on actual events
Films directed by Tom McLoughlin
Films scored by Sean Callery
Films set in Oklahoma
Films shot in Louisiana
Lifetime (TV network) films
2000s English-language films
2000s American films